Nicole Vaidišová Štěpánková (born 23 April 1989) is a Czech former professional tennis player.

Vaidišová is an Australian Open and French Open semifinalist as well as a two-time quarterfinalist at Wimbledon. She started playing tennis when she was six years old, enrolling to train at Nick Bollettieri's tennis academy in Bradenton, Florida. Her serve was considered her biggest weapon. Her powerful groundstrokes, with her serve, collaborated well together to produce an aggressive, all-round game. On 9 August 2006, at the age of 17 years, she became the 12th-youngest player in WTA Tour history to be ranked in the top 10. She achieved a career-high ranking of world No. 7, on 14 May 2007. Her form dipped shortly after, and at the time her retirement was announced in 2010, she was ranked at No. 177.

Her stepfather announced that she had retired in March 2010, citing "lack of interest in tennis" as the primary reason, but she returned to the sport in September 2014. However, in July 2016, she retired once more due to injuries.

Career

2003–2004: Instant success
Vaidišová debuted in 2003 by reaching three consecutive finals and winning the ITF tournament in Plzeň, Czech Republic.

In 2004, her first full year as a professional, Vaidišová finished the year as a top 100 player. As a qualifier at only her third WTA Tour main draw at inaugural Vancouver, she became the sixth-youngest singles champion in tour history at an age of 15 years, three months, and 23 days. She also became the lowest-ranked player (No. 180) and second qualifier (of three) to win a title in 2004. During the summer, she played World TeamTennis for the Sacramento Capitals and was named the league's Female MVP and Female Rookie of the Year. Vaidišová won her second title of the year at the Tashkent Open, defeating Virginie Razzano in the final. On 18 October, she made her top 100 debut at No. 74, becoming the youngest player in the top 100 at the time.

Later in the year, Vaidišová reached the quarterfinals at the Japan Open in Tokyo. She made her Grand Slam debut at the US Open, losing to defending champion and No. 1, Justine Henin, in the first round.

Vaidišová finished the year with two WTA titles and a win–loss record of 31–8.

2005–2007: Consistency and top 10 debut

In early January, Vaidišová reached her first quarterfinal of the season in Hobart. She picked up her first Grand Slam singles victory in her Australian Open debut, by reaching the third round before falling to top seed Lindsay Davenport.

In April, she made her top 50 debut at No. 47 and reached her first career Tier I quarterfinal at the Charleston Open. She posted her first top 10 victory over defending French Open champion Anastasia Myskina, before eventually losing to Patty Schnyder in the quarterfinals, and making her top 40 debut as a result at No. 34 on 18 April. In May, Vaidišová reached her first Tier III final in Istanbul, losing to top seed Venus Williams in the championship match. She made her debut at the French Open where she fell to 22nd-seeded Francesca Schiavone in the second round.

In August, Vaidišová reached the quarterfinals at Toronto, losing to Justine Henin. At the US Open, she reached the fourth round for the first time at a Grand Slam event before losing to Nadia Petrova.

Vaidišová's captured her first title of 2005 (and third of her career) in Seoul, defeating top seed Jelena Janković in the final without dropping a set during the week. She followed by winning her second straight tour singles title in Tokyo, winning when Tatiana Golovin retired in the final. On 10 October, Vaidišová made her top 20 debut at No. 18 and extended her winning streak to 15 matches, by winning her third consecutive tour singles title and fifth of her career; she defeated Nadia Petrova for the first time in the final of the Bangkok. With her three consecutive titles, Vaidišová became the first player since Lindsay Davenport in 2004 to win three titles in three weeks, and also became the sixth woman to win five tour singles titles before her 17th birthday (after Tracy Austin, Andrea Jaeger, Monica Seles, Jennifer Capriati and Martina Hingis).

Vaidišová captured her sixth WTA Tour title at the Tier III event in Strasbourg in May 2006. In June, she made a semifinal run at the French Open, her best Grand Slam performance to date. She defeated world No. 1 and home favourite, Amélie Mauresmo, in the fourth round and Venus Williams in the quarterfinal. However, she lost to Svetlana Kuznetsova in the next round, despite being only two points away from victory several times. At Wimbledon, she got to the fourth round before losing to Li Na. Vaidišová's fourth-round appearance meant that she has advanced to the round of 16 or better in each of the four Grand Slam tournaments.

In July, Vaidišová went 2–0 during the Czech Republic's 3–2 Fed Cup World Group Play-offs loss to France. She reached the semifinal on her debut in Stanford, losing to Kim Clijsters. Vaidišová reached her career-first Tier I semifinal in San Diego, losing to Clijsters again. After her success in San Diego, Vaidišová moved from No. 12 to No. 9, her first career top 10 debut, becoming the 12th-youngest player in tour history to crack the top 10, at an age of 17 years, three months and two weeks.

At the US Open, she made it to the third round, but lost to Jelena Janković, who later made it to the semifinal. Vaidišová defeated Mauresmo for the second time at the Kremlin Cup, after rallying from 1–6, 2–5 down and three match points in their quarterfinal match. However, she lost to Nadia Petrova for a third time in their four meetings in the semifinal afterwards. She managed to finish 2006 at No. 10, making it her most successful season.

Beginning 2007, Vaidišová reached the semifinals of the Sydney International, beating Ana Ivanovic for the first time before falling to Jelena Janković. She went on to reach her second Grand Slam semifinal at the Australian Open, losing to eventual champion Serena Williams.

She skipped a large majority of the clay season with a right wrist injury. However, she reached the quarterfinals of the French Open, where she was defeated by Jelena Janković.

In her first grass-court tournament of the season at Eastbourne, Vaidišová lost in the quarterfinals to Justine Henin. At Wimbledon, she lost to Ana Ivanovic in the quarterfinals after failing to convert three match points. She earlier had defeated defending champion Amélie Mauresmo in the fourth round and Victoria Azarenka in the third round.

Vaidišová was out for two months after Wimbledon due to glandular fever. She returned at the US Open, where she lost to Shahar Pe'er in the third round. Moving into the indoor season, she played the Kremlin Cup, losing to Serena Williams in the quarterfinals. The next week in Zürich, Vaidišová reached the semifinals, achieving a notable victory over Jelena Janković. In the semifinals, she lost to Justine Henin in three sets. She finished the year by making another semifinal in Linz.

2008–2010: Struggles and retirement

Vaidišová played three hardcourt tournaments in Australia to start the year. She reached the semifinals of the Sydney International, defeating Jelena Janković in the quarterfinals before losing to Svetlana Kuznetsova in the semifinals.

The week after the Australian Open, Vaidišová won both of her Fed Cup singles matches in the tie against Slovakia. Following that, she lost six consecutive matches.

As the 18th seed at Wimbledon, she had an unexpected run to the quarterfinals, losing to Zheng Jie.

She finished the year with another pair of consecutive losses, and had tumbled to No. 41 in the world over the course of the season.

In 2009, Vaidišová's ranking fell out of the top 100. She often was spotted watching numerous matches of her boyfriend Radek Štěpánek. At the end of the year, Vaidišová was ranked No. 187.

Vaidišová started 2010 by playing ITF Women's Circuit events. Later in March, her stepfather and former coach Ales Kodat announced her decision to retire from her professional career at the age of 20 due to a lack of interest in tennis. "Her agent told me last week... she's fed up with tennis and that's understandable. She started very young", Kodat said. Kodat said she had turned down a wildcard to play in Miami starting on 23 March.

2014: Comeback
Vaidišová received a wildcard to compete in the ITF Albuquerque, a $75k event, starting on 15 September. This marked her return to professional tennis in over four years. She won her first match in straight sets against Sesil Karatantcheva, before losing in the second round to Johanna Konta 6–1, 1–6, 4–6.

2015
At the Monterrey Open in March, she qualified for her first WTA Tour main draw since 2010 but she drew top seed and defending champion Ana Ivanovic in the first round. Vaidišová lost 1–6, 6–7; she had qualified for the main draw only seven hours before her match against Ivanovic.

She played at Miami Open as wildcard. She won her first-round match against Tímea Babos in straight sets, and lost in the second round to No. 3 seed Simona Halep, in three sets.

2016: Second retirement
In July, Vaidišová announced her second and permanent retirement from professional tennis.

Personal life
Vaidišová was introduced to tennis by her mother Riana. She has three younger brothers, Filip, Oliver and Toby. She speaks Czech, English, and German.

Vaidišová became engaged to fellow Czech tennis player Radek Štěpánek, who is 11 years older, in late 2007. It has been suggested that the relationship was the cause of Vaidišová's decline in tennis. The two married on 17 July 2010 at Prague Castle. In June 2013, Vaidišová and Štěpánek announced that they had filed for divorce. In 2018, they remarried and became parents of a daughter, Stella. In December 2021, she gave birth to a second daughter, Meda.

Endorsements
Vaidišová was the face of Reebok and has been featured in their "I Am What I Am" and "Run Easy" campaigns. She also endorsed Citizen Watches and its Eco-Drive design. She is represented by Olivier van Lindonk of IMG. During her career, she used Yonex racquets.

In 2007, Vaidišová was featured in Virtua Tennis 3, a videogame developed by Sega and released for PlayStation 3, Xbox 360, Microsoft Windows and PlayStation Portable.

Performance timelines
Only main-draw results in WTA Tour, Grand Slam tournaments, Fed Cup and Olympic Games are included in win–loss records.

Singles

Doubles

WTA career finals

Singles: 7 (6 titles, 1 runner-up)

ITF finals

Singles: 3 (2 titles, 1 runner-up)

WTA Tour career earnings
Vaidišová earned more than 2M during her career.

Record against other players

Record against top 10 players
Vaidišová's record against players who have been ranked in the top 10. Active players are in boldface.

No. 1 wins

Wins over top 10 players

Notes

References

External links

 
 
 

Czech expatriate sportspeople in Germany
Czech expatriate sportspeople in the United States
Czech female tennis players
German people of Czech descent
Olympic tennis players of the Czech Republic
Sportspeople from Nuremberg
Tennis players from Prague
Tennis players at the 2008 Summer Olympics
1989 births
Living people